Thomas Radlspeck (born 16 November 1972) is a German former professional footballer who played as a midfielder or forward.

References

External links

Living people
1972 births
Association football midfielders
Association football forwards
German footballers
FC Bayern Munich II players
SpVgg Unterhaching players
SC Freiburg players
Grazer AK players
SSV Jahn Regensburg players
Bundesliga players
2. Bundesliga players
Footballers from Munich